Laurent Labit (born 8 May 1973) is a retired French rugby union footballer, and current backs coach of the French national team.

Early life
Labit was born in Revel, France. He began his playing career in his home town of Rugby Club Revélois before moving to Castres.

Career

He started his playing career at Rugby Club Revelois. Labit later joined Castres Olympique where he won the 1992–93 French Rugby Union Championship at the Parc des Princes against Grenoble by beating them 14-11 in the final, in a match decided by an irregular try accorded by the referee.  A try by Olivier Brouzet is denied to FC Grenoble
and the decisive try by Gary Whetton was awarded by the referee, Daniel Salles, when in fact the defender Hueber from Grenoble touched down the ball first in his try zone. This error gave the title to Castres. Salles admitted the error only 13 years later.

"Rugby will come out even stronger."

Labit also spent some time at US Colomiers , AS Béziers , Union Bordeaux-Bègles and UA Gaillac where he an made impact as a back line player. In his early years he represented France at a U23 level and later played for France A, but never managed to get selected for France national rugby union team

Labit's coaching career started at US Montauban in 2004, where he helped them get promoted into the Top 14 in the 2006 season together with Laurent Travers. At the end of the 2008-2009 season, Labit joined Olympic Castres with Laurent Travers and in the 2012 - 2013 season, both coaches lead the club to win the Top 14 Championship after which both Labit and Travers where recruited by Racing Métro, now known as Racing 92, for the 2013 - 2014 Top 14 season, Racing Metro managed to get the semi-finals before being eliminated from the tournament.

Playing career 
1987-1996 : Castres Olympique
1996-1999 : US Colomiers
1999-2002 : AS Béziers
2002-2003 : Union Bordeaux-Bègles
2003-2004 : UA Gaillac

Coaching career 
 2004-2009 : US Montauban
 2009-2013 : Castres olympique
 2013-2019 : Racing 92

Notes and references

External links

 Racing 92 Official website

1968 births
Living people
French rugby union players
Sportspeople from Haute-Garonne
Castres Olympique players
US Colomiers players
CA Bordeaux-Bègles Gironde players
French rugby union coaches
Racing 92 coaches
AS Béziers Hérault players
Rugby union fullbacks